Steve Sueng Jun Yoo (born December 15, 1976), also known as his Korean name Yoo Seung-jun, is a Korean-American singer and actor who became one of South Korea's most popular K-pop singers after his debut in 1997. Yoo's singing career ended in 2002 when he was accused of evading South Korean mandatory military service by becoming a U.S. citizen. He was subsequently banned from entering South Korea, becoming the only person in history to be banned from the country for acquiring another citizenship. Since then, Yoo has been working as an actor in China.

Early life 
Yoo was born on December 15, 1976, in Seoul, South Korea. He and his family immigrated to the United States when he was thirteen and settled in Buena Park, California. Yoo made demo tapes of his rapping and dance skills and sent these to Brothers Entertainment, where he was eventually scouted and left California to start his career as a singer.

Career

1997: Debut
Yoo made his South Korean debut as a singer in 1997.  His first album West Side was a hit with the debut single "Gawi" ("gawi" is the Korean word for "scissors" - in this context it translates to "nightmare" as South Koreans use the word to describe the rigid sleep paralysis which sometimes accompanies bad dreams). Along with another single "I Love You, Noona," he won "Best Newcomer of the Year" at many award ceremonies. Yoo gained popularity with his signature dance move "Gawi," in which he and his backup dancers lined up diagonally to perform the same moves in unison. "West Side" sold a million copies.

1998
In the summer of 1998, he released his second album 1998 V2 for SALE with "Na Na Na" ("나나나") as its lead song, where it and the music video topped the charts. In the video, it featured actress Choi Ji-woo, who played as the internship teacher while he played as the troublesome student. Many consider this album as the most successful of his career, as it won him Best Artist of the Year in multiple award ceremonies. The album again sold 1 million records.

1999
In 1999, he went on to release his third album Now Or Never, which contained the hit single "Passion".  Later that year, Yoo released his fourth album, "Over and Over," which contained the hit single "Vision."

2000
During this time, he began to expand his career into China and Taiwan, with the release of the single "Can't Wait", which was a collaboration with Taiwanese singer Yuki. Now or Never topped the South Korean charts with first week sales of 879,000 albums sold.  Setting a record for the highest first week sales ever at the time. The album eventually sold close to 1.5 million units. He also released music videos for two of his Korean songs that year for "찾길 바래" & "어제 오늘 그리고", the latter showing off a more sophisticated image.

2001
In 2001, he released the single "Wow" from his sixth album "Infinity." Though considered a disappointment critically and commercially compared to his last three albums, "Infinity" still debuted at No. 1 on the charts with first-week sales of 359,961 units. The album went to achieve sales of over 600,000.

2002: banishment  
Yoo had repeatedly stated on television that he would fulfill his mandatory military service. But in 2002, just before he was to be drafted, he became a naturalized U.S. citizen. As a result, the South Korean government considered it an act of desertion, and deported him, permanently banning him from entering the country.

Post-banishment 
In 2003, his father-in-law, who resided in Korea, died. Korea's Ministry of Justice allowed Yoo temporary entry into Korea for two days.
In 2006, he was featured on rapper H-Eugene's song "독불장군". The song's music video does not show Yoo's face, but shows him dancing and his silhouette.

In 2007, he released his seventh album Yoo Seungjun Vol. 7 - Rebirth of YSJ for his fans who stood by him through the highs and lows of his career. The album was produced under the collaboration of production teams from the United States, China, and South Korea. He released singles such as "Missing U," "Breakin' Love," "One For Me" and "Fireworks."

He earned a role in an untitled Taiwanese drama loosely based on Bret Easton Ellis's novel Less than Zero. In June 2008, Yoo signed a 15-year contract with Jackie Chan's entertainment management company to become an actor. He has since attempted to establish a name for himself in mainland China while continuing his singing and acting career.

In February 2010, Yoo made his film debut in Jackie Chan's Little Big Soldier as Prince Wen.

In 2015, it was announced that Yoo would appear in the film Dragon Blade.

In 2022, Steve Yoo is currently an enrolled student in Westminster Seminary California.

Personal life
In 2011, in response to an announcement by South Korean television network Seoul Broadcasting System on holding a public poll on whether South Koreans think Yoo should be allowed to come back to South Korea, he said he had no plans to return.

In December 2013, rumor had it that the ban on Yoo was lifted and that he could enter South Korea. In January 2014, however, South Korea's Military Manpower Association released a statement firmly denying the allegation.

On May 19, 2015, Yoo appeared in a video where he opened up on his side of the story regarding his evading military service back in 2002. He appeared getting down on his hands and knees begging to be accepted back into South Korea promising that he would "do whatever it takes" and that he would accept any condition the South Korean government allowed.

On February 23, 2017, following a court hearing, Yoo lost his second and final appeal for having his entry ban lifted, and is no longer allowed to return to South Korea, nor he is able to appeal his entry ban in the future.

On July 11, 2019, the South Korean Supreme Court sent Yoo's previously closed case back to the Seoul High Court.

On November 15, 2019, an appeals court reversed its earlier decision and ruled in favor of Yoo, which could finally allow him to visit South Korea.

Ever since his banishment from South Korea in 2002, Yoo has made residence in Beijing, China. Soon after, he moved back to the United States to live in Los Angeles, California. Yoo married Christine Oh in 2004 with whom he has 4 children. In October 2019, Yoo launched his YouTube channel where he posted videos of his daily workout routine.

Yoo is a practitioner of Taekwondo which he has been a practitioner of during the height of his celebrity days which he featured his skills on some of the Korean TV shows of the time. In 2010 when he was invited as a guest on the show Asia Uncut, he stated he (at the time of filming) held 3rd Dan black belt.

Discography

Studio albums

Extended plays

Compilations and live albums 
 98 Live Album (1998)
 New Release + English Version (1999)
 All That Yoo Seung Jun (1999)
 Gold Techno Remix (2000)
 Hidden Story (2001)
 Best & J Duet Collection (2001)
 Yoo Seung Jun 2002 Live (2002)

Filmography

Movies 
 Little Big Soldier (2010)
 He-Man (2011)
 Scheme With Me (2012) 
 Chinese Zodiac (2012)
 Man of Tai Chi (2013)
 The Wrath of Vajra (2013)
 Long's Story (2014)
 The Break-Up Artist (2014) 
 Dragon Blade (2015)
 Taste of Love (2015) 
 Crazy Fist (2017) 
 Romantic Warrior (2017) 
 Invictus Basketball (2017) 
 Blade Master Li Bai (2019)

Television 
The Sleuth of the Ming Dynasty (2020) 
 The Patriot Yue Fei (2013)

Awards and nominations

Golden Disc Awards

Mnet Asian Music Awards

Seoul Music Awards

References

External links
 

1976 births
Living people
Draft evaders
American musicians of Korean descent
South Korean emigrants to the United States
People from Buena Park, California
People who lost South Korean citizenship
Naturalized citizens of the United States
People from Seoul
South Korean male idols
Gangneung Yoo clan